Evgeny Muratov (born 28 January 1981) is a Russian professional ice hockey forward who currently plays for Yugra Khanty-Mansiysk of the Kontinental Hockey League (KHL). He had previously played in the KHL with HC Sibir Novosibirsk. He was selected by the Edmonton Oilers in the 9th round (274th overall) of the 2000 NHL Entry Draft.

Career statistics

Regular season and playoffs

International

References

External links

1981 births
Living people
Edmonton Oilers draft picks
HC Sibir Novosibirsk players
People from Nizhny Tagil
Russian ice hockey forwards
HC Yugra players
Tatar people of Russia
Tatar sportspeople
Sportspeople from Sverdlovsk Oblast